Diamond Ratna Babu is an Indian public relations officer and media consultant who predominantly works in Tamil cinema. He has worked more than 600 films as public relations officer in Indian cinema.

Early life 
Babu's father Film News Anandan was one of the earliest journalists, managers and chroniclers of Tamil cinema, and he wanted his son to enter the film industry. Babu, on the other hand, was comfortably educated in Delhi and employed in a bank. To satisfy his father's wish, he left his bank job, started the "Diamond" film club and screened films for a close group at Devi Bala, Sathyam and Subham theatres in the early 80's. Tamil films faced some hiccups at the censors, and one such trouble was the reason Babu became a fully fledged PRO, since he realised that being knowledgeable in Hindi, he could be a bridge between the north and the south.

Career 
In 1986, when producer Aabhavanan wanted to convert a five-minute documentary into a commercial film, Babu's father canvassed for funds—the concept of crowdfunding is not new – and Babu got drawn into the struggle and was made the PRO. In 1986, when Oomai Vizhigal faced some hurdle in getting the censorship, Babu was able to liaise with the tribunal in Delhi. The film, starring Vijayakanth was a blockbuster hit. After Oomai Vizhigal his next nine films were also successive blockbuster hits and he was looked as lucky PRO in Tamil film industry.

Selected filmography

Accolades

References

External links 
Official website

1960 births
Film people from Tamil Nadu
Film producers from Tamil Nadu
Indian male film actors
Living people
Male actors in Tamil cinema
Tamil film producers
Tamil male actors